United Nations Security Council Resolution 2014 was unanimously adopted on 21 October 2011.

Resolution
The Security Council expressed "grave concern at the situation in Yemen" and the "worsening security situation." It also called for increased humanitarian support from the international community, while calling for an end to violence in Yemen amidst an Arab Spring-linked civil uprising and the potential growth of Al-Qaida in the Arabian Peninsula. The resolution also requested the Secretary-General to report back to them on the implementation of this resolution both within the "first 30 days...and every 60 days thereafter." The resolution also called for President Ali Abdullah Saleh to accept a peace plan brokered by the Gulf Cooperation Council for an orderly transfer of power and a "full and immediate ceasefire" between the warring factions of Saleh's supporters and the anti-government protesters. It also called for an independent investigation into the event that led to the violence.

Reactions
United Nations human rights office condemned the violence in Yemen.

Saleh welcomed the resolution; at the same time Yemeni security forces killed one protester.

See also 
List of United Nations Security Council Resolutions 2001 to 2100

References

External links
 Text of UNSCR 2014 at undocs.org

 2014
2011 in Yemen
United Nations Security Council resolutions concerning Yemen
International reactions to the Arab Spring
October 2011 events